In the run-up to the 2020 Croatian parliamentary election, various organisations have been carrying out monthly opinion polling to gauge voting intention in Croatia. Results of such polls are displayed in this article. The date range is from after the previous parliamentary election, held on 11 September 2016, to 5 July 2020 when 2020 elections were held.

Polling average

Graph 

The following graph depicts the evolution of standings of the two main political parties and other parties in the poll average since last parliamentary elections.

Table

Coalition standings
Poll results published by major national televisions are listed in the table below in reverse chronological order, showing the most recent first, and using the date of publication. The highest percentage figure in each polling survey is displayed in bold, and the background shaded in the leading coalition's color. In the instance that there is a tie, then no figure is shaded. The lead column on the right shows the percentage-point difference between the two coalitions with the highest figures. When a specific poll does not show a data figure for a coalition, the coalition's cell corresponding to that poll is shown empty.

Seat projections

National
(excluding electoral districts XI and XII)

Per electoral district

Electoral district I

Electoral district II

Electoral district III

Electoral district IV

Electoral district V

Electoral district VI

Electoral district VII

Electoral district VIII

Electoral district IX

Electoral district X

Individual party standings
Poll results published by major national televisions are listed in the table below in reverse chronological order, showing the most recent first, and using the date of publication. The highest percentage figure in each polling survey is displayed in bold, and the background shaded in the leading party's color. In the instance that there is a tie, then no figure is shaded. The lead column on the right shows the percentage-point difference between the two parties with the highest figures. When a specific poll does not show a data figure for a party, the party's cell corresponding to that poll is shown empty.

Notes

References

Opinion polling in Croatia
Elections in Croatia